The 1971 Cincinnati Bengals season was the franchise's 2nd season in the National Football League, and the 4th overall. Cornerback Lemar Parrish set a team record with seven interceptions, including one for a 65-yard score, Cincinnati's first-ever interception return for a touchdown. The Bengals, coming off their first division-winning season of 1970, drafted quarterback Ken Anderson in the third round of the 1971 NFL Draft. Anderson would go on to play 16 seasons for the club and set numerous team passing records. While 1971 proved to be a disappointment, losing six games by four points or less, statistically this was the first year the Bengals led their opponents in almost every category.

Offseason

NFL Draft

Personnel

Staff

Roster

Regular season

Schedule

Season summary

Week 1 vs Eagles

Standings

Team stats

Team leaders
Passing: Virgil Carter (222 Att, 138 Comp, 1624 Yds, 62.2 Pct, 10 TD, 7 Int, 86.2 Rating) 
Rushing: Fred Willis (135 Att, 590 Yds, 4.4 Avg, 36 Long, 7 TD) 
Receiving: Bob Trumpy (40 Rec, 531 Yds, 13.3 Avg, 44 Long, 3 TD) 
Scoring: Horst Muhlmann, 91 points (20 FG; 31 PAT)

Awards and records

Pro Bowl selections
CB Lemar Parrish

References

External links
 1971 Cincinnati Bengals at Pro-Football-Reference.com

Cincinnati Bengals
Cincinnati Bengals seasons
Cincinnati